Longdale Furnace is an unincorporated community located east of Clifton Forge in Alleghany County, Virginia, United States.

Much of the community was designated a national historic district and added to the National Register of Historic Places in 1998. The district encompasses 27 contributing buildings, 8 contributing sites, and 3 contributing structures historically associated with the Longdale Iron Company foundries' operations and personnel.  It includes the original stone furnace stack (1827), two-story Longdale Iron Company Office (late-1820s), Longdale Iron Company Laboratory, two tall cylindrical brick chimneys, brick machine shop, Firmstone-Johnson House (1870s–1880s), the Queen Anne-style Assistant Manager's House (1870s–1880s), and the Company Doctor's Office.

References

External links
GNIS reference

Unincorporated communities in Alleghany County, Virginia
Historic districts in Alleghany County, Virginia
National Register of Historic Places in Alleghany County, Virginia
Historic districts on the National Register of Historic Places in Virginia
1827 establishments in Virginia
Unincorporated communities in Virginia